Alan Warren Haig (July 19, 1922 – November 16, 1982) was an American jazz pianist, best known as one of the pioneers of bebop.

Biography
Haig was born in Newark, New Jersey and raised in nearby Nutley. In 1940, he majored in piano at Oberlin College. He started performing with Dizzy Gillespie and Charlie Parker in 1945, and performed and recorded under Gillespie from 1945 to 1946, as a member of Eddie Davis and His Beboppers in 1946 (also featuring Fats Navarro), and the Eddie Davis Quintet in 1947, under Parker from 1948 to 1950, and under Stan Getz from 1949 to 1951. The Gillespie quintet, which included Haig, recorded four 78 r.p.m. sides for Guild Records in May 1945 which are regarded as the first recordings to demonstrate all elements of the mature bebop style. He was part of the nonet on the first session of Miles Davis' Birth of the Cool.

For much of the 1950s and 1960s, "Haig was all but a forgotten giant", in Brian Case's words; "Jazz pianism, ever more percussive in a crass simplification of [Bud] Powell's methods, had no room for the crystalline touch and swift, logical turnover of ideas. Haig got by with semi-cocktail piano in New York bars." Although Haig is best remembered for playing bebop, he spent much of his career playing in non-jazz contexts. His work was the subject of a revival in the 1970s.

In 1969, Haig was acquitted of a murder charge. He had been accused of strangling his third wife, Bonnie, at their home in Clifton, New Jersey, on October 9, 1968. He had said in evidence that his wife had been drunk, and had died in a fall down a flight of stairs. Grange Rutan, Haig's second wife, challenged Haig's account in her 2007 book, Death of a Bebop Wife. Rutan's book is partly autobiographical, partly based on interviews with friends and family members. She describes Bonnie's story in detail, describing an underside to Haig that included a history of serial domestic abuse. Rutan observed that several family members sounded alarm bells regarding Haig's violent personality that went unheeded. She quotes bassist Hal Gaylor, who was talking with Haig before a performance at the Edison Hotel lounge in the early seventies, when Haig admitted to him he had caused Bonnie's death.

In 1974, Haig was invited to tour Europe by Tony Williams, owner of Spotlite Records in the United Kingdom. At the end of a very successful tour he recorded the Invitation album for Spotlite with Bibi Rovère on bass and Kenny Clarke on drums. This kick-started his re-emergence and, over the next eight years, he built a strong following in Europe and toured several times, recording in the UK and France, and appearing elsewhere. He also recorded for several Japanese labels.

Haig died from a heart attack on November 16, 1982 and was survived by his wife Joanne and his sons Alan and Daniel.

Discography

As leader

As sideman
With Chet Baker
 Chet Baker in New York (Riverside, 1958)
With Miles Davis
Birth of the Cool (Capitol, 1949)
With Miles Davis, Stan Getz and Lee Konitz
 Conception (Prestige, 1956)
With Dizzy Gillespie
 The Complete RCA Victor Recordings (Bluebird, 1937–1949 [1995])
With Stan Getz
 Stan Getz Quartets (Prestige, 1949–50 [1955])
Prezervation (Prestige, 1949–50)
 The Complete Roost Recordings (Blue Note, 1950–54 [1997]) (includes Stan Getz at Storyville Vol 1 and Stan Getz at Storyville Vol 2)
With Phil Woods
 The Young Bloods (Prestige, 1956) with Donald Byrd

Main sources:

References

External links
Al Haig Discography Project

American jazz pianists
American male pianists
Bebop pianists
1922 births
1982 deaths
Jazz musicians from New York (state)
Musicians from New Jersey
Oberlin College alumni
People from Clifton, New Jersey
People from Nutley, New Jersey
Xanadu Records artists
20th-century American pianists
20th-century American male musicians
American male jazz musicians